Adam Robertson is an American politician, businessman, and engineer serving as a member of the Utah House of Representatives for the 63rd district, which includes Provo, Utah.

Early life and education 
Robertson was born in Rexburg, Idaho. He earned a Bachelor of Science in electrical engineering and Master of Business Administration from Brigham Young University.

Career 
From 1998 to 2000, Robertson worked as a manufacturing engineer at Hewlett-Packard. Robertson also worked as a manager and designer at Agilent Technologies. From 2010 to 2012, Robertson was an adjunct professor at Brigham Young University. From 2007 to 2017, Robertson served as the president of IMSAR, LLC, a radar technology company based in Spanish Fork, Utah. Since 2016, Robertson has worked as the CFO of Fortem Technologies Incorporated, a company he co-founded. Robertson was nominated to serve as a member of the Utah House of Representatives on January 16, 2018. Within the Utah Legislature, Robertson currently serves on the Business, Economic Development, and Labor Appropriations Subcommittee, House Education Committee, and House Revenue and Taxation Committee.

2022 sponsored legislation

References 

American engineers
Engineers from Utah
Engineers from Idaho
Brigham Young University alumni
Republican Party members of the Utah House of Representatives
Businesspeople from Utah
Businesspeople from Idaho
Living people
Year of birth missing (living people)
People from Rexburg, Idaho
21st-century American politicians